Several places in the U.S. state of Virginia are known as Waterloo:
 Waterloo, Clarke County, Virginia
 Waterloo, Culpeper County, Virginia
 Waterloo, Fauquier County, Virginia
 Waterloo, New Kent County, Virginia